Mangelia micropleura is a minute extinct species of sea snail, a marine gastropod mollusk in the family Mangeliidae.

Description

Distribution
This extinct marine species was found in Pliocene strata of Trinidad.

References

 R.J.L. Guppy, West Indian Tertiary Fossils, Geological Magazine, 1874. p. 439

External links

micropleura
Gastropods described in 1867